Sivar Arnér (13 March 1909 – 13 January 1997) was a Swedish novelist and playwright.

Biography
Sivar Arnér was born at Arby parish in Kalmar County, Sweden. Arnér was the son of the merchant Ernst Arnér and Hilda Nilsson. 
His brother  Gotthard Arnér (1913-2002) was a cathedral organist first at Växjö Cathedral and later at Storkyrkan in Stockholm.
His brother  Ivar Arnér (1921-1986) was an economist and chief financial officer of Gothenburg Railways.

He attended Lund University where he received his Ph.D. in 1932.
He was employed as a teacher at Karlskrona, Skara and Norrköping until 1948.
He subsequently settled in Stockholm to become a full-time writer.
Among his novels are Plånbok borttappad (1943), Knekt och klerk (1945) and  Tvärbalk (1963). Arnér also published a number of dramas including Fem hörspel (1959)  and Drottningen (1984). He was awarded the Dobloug Prize in 1971.

Personal life
He was married to the Hungarian-born artist and author Lenke Rothman (1929–2008). They were the parents of Elias Arnér (born 1966), noted professor in biochemistry at the Karolinska Institutet.
Sivar Arnér  died during 1997 in Stockholm and was buried at Voxtorp Church, Kalmar County.

References

External links

1909 births
1997 deaths
People from Kalmar County
Lund University alumni
20th-century Swedish dramatists and playwrights
20th-century Swedish novelists
Dobloug Prize winners
Swedish male novelists
Swedish male dramatists and playwrights
20th-century Swedish male writers